HanseYachts AG is a German yacht manufacturer headquartered in the city of Greifswald (Baltic Sea). The company is one of the world's largest manufacturers of sailing yachts with lengths of 29 ft (ca. 9 meters) to 67 ft (20.42 meters). The company offers monohull sailboats under the Hanse, Dehler and Moody brands. Motorboats are sold under the Fjord and Sealine brands. HanseYachts is cooperating with the yacht designers Patrick Banfield, Berret-Racoupeau, Bill Dixon and Judel/Vrolijk & Co.

The Group's products and brands are innovative, established in the market, and have a long history. Different types of yachts are offered under each brand. The consistent expansion of the product portfolio is part of the Group's multi-brand strategy, and the entire product portfolio now comprises 40 different models. The yachts are sold by authorized dealers and the Group's own sales companies. The Group's own sales companies are located in Germany and the United States. The Group's products are sold by a worldwide network of around 230 dealers. All boats are manufactured exclusively on the basis of firm customer orders.

Corporate affairs 
HanseYachts AG is the parent company of the HanseYachts Group. It performs central holding company functions and manages most of the operating business of the Group. HanseYachts AG holds 100 % of the equity in nearly all subsidiaries, either directly or indirectly. The subsidiaries are Hanse (Deutschland) Vertriebs GmbH & Co. KG, Verwaltung Hanse (Deutschland) Vertriebs GmbH, HanseYachts Marken Portfolio AG & Co. KG, Moody Yachts GmbH, Dehler Yachts GmbH, Sealine Yachts GmbH, Hanse Yachts US, LLC, USA, HanseYachts Sp. z o.o. in Poland (known as Technologie Tworzyw Sztucznych Sp. z o.o., or “TTS” for short, until 3 October 2022) with its subsidiary Balticdesign Institut Sp. z o.o., and Yachtzentrum Greifswald Beteiligungs-GmbH with its no longer operationally active subsidiary Mediterranean Yacht Service Center SARL, France. 

Effective 17 October 2022, HanseYachts AG sold its equity interest in Privilege Marine as a portfolio optimization step. The French catamaran manufacturer based in Port Olona, Les Sables d'Olonne, France, was purchased by a consortium headed by the related person and longtime CEO Gilles Wagner, along with a group of the company's customers.

One of the world's oldest catamaran brands, Privilege builds ocean-going luxury catamarans sold at prices of €1.5 million to €5 million. The company had been acquired by HanseYachts AG in June 2019, but remained operationally autonomous. Since the acquisition, the entire product line was completely renewed with great market success. Because the anticipated synergy effects did not materialize to the hoped-for extent, HanseYachts sold the company and can now focus on its remaining six brands. 

The HanseYachts Group is included in the consolidated financial statements of AURELIUS Equity Opportunities SE & Co. KGaA, Grunwald. 

HanseYachts AG has been listed in the General Standard section of the Frankfurt Stock Exchange since 2007.

History

Founding, rise, IPO (1990–2007)

HanseYachts is originated in an old-established shipyard for fishing cutters and other workboats. The today's company was founded in 1990 – after the fall of the Iron Curtain – by Michael Schmidt, the winner of the 1985 Admiral's Cup. At the beginning, Yachtzentrum Greifswald – so the former name of HanseYachts – focused on yacht refit and other services. The first model Hanse 291 (which based on the design of the Aphrodite 291) was launched in 1993. In the years to come, the company successively extended the model range and grew rapidly. In the late 1990s, HanseYachts and the yacht designers Judel/Vrolijk & Co started their still existing collaboration. In 2003, the range comprised eight models up to 53  ft. In 2007, HanseYachts AG went public (General Standard, Frankfurt). Founder Michael Schmidt remained majority shareholder.

Brand acquisitions and powerboat market entry (2006–2009)
For more than a decade, HanseYachts built sailing yachts only. In 2006, the company acquired the majority of Norwegian powerboat manufacturer Fjord Boats AS and started to develop seagoing powerboats. In 2007, the English Moody brand (sailing yachts) was added, and the creation of a new Moody range with decksaloon and aftcockpit models began. Furthermore, HanseYachts bought the remaining shares in Fjord Boats AS and introduced a first new Fjord model (Fjord 40 open). In 2008, the company completed the enlargement of its plant in Greifswald and the construction of a new production facility in Goleniów. In 2009, HanseYachts purchased its German competitor Dehler Yachtbau comprising the Dehler and Varianta brands as well as a production facility located in Freienohl, Germany.

Crisis, change of ownership and recovery (2008–2016)
In the wake of the financial crisis 2007–2008, the boating industry was affected by a massive slump in global sales. The company's turnover dropped by 57% within one year. A period of high losses began. In 2011, founder Michael Schmidt sold his stake to German Investment holding Aurelius SE, Munich, and left the company. At the end of 2012, HanseYachts closed the Dehler factory in Freienohl and relocated the entire Dehler production to its lamination factory in Goleniów and its main factory in Greifswald. In 2013, HanseYachts parent company Aurelius SE purchased the English Sealine brand (motor yachts) together with plans, moulds, parts lists and equipment. In 2014, HanseYachts started to produce Sealine yachts.

Current models

Sailing yachts 

1 one design class
Naval architects: Berret-Racoupeau (Hanse), Judel/Vrolijk & Co (Hanse, Dehler), Bill Dixon (Moody)

Motor yachts 

1 model with outboard engines
Naval architects: Patrick Banfield (Fjord), Bill Dixon (Sealine, Ryck)

Sales figures and turnover 

Sources: 2004/05 until 2020/21

Awards 

 "Boatbuilder of the Year 2016" (British Yachting Awards)
"Boatbuilder of the Year 2018" (British Yachting Awards)

External links 

 
 List of yacht brands
 List of brands with sailboats for sale
 List of brands with motor yachts for sale
 The Moody 54 DS (in German), Frankfurter Allgemeine Zeitung, October 2014

References

Companies based in Mecklenburg-Western Pomerania
Yacht building companies
German brands
Manufacturing companies established in 1990
German companies established in 1990